Campanelle  (Italian for "bellflowers" or "little bells"), is a type of pasta which is shaped like a cone with a ruffled edge, or a bell-like flower. It is also sometimes referred to as gigli. It is intended to be served with a thick sauce, or in a casserole.

In Italian, campanelle can also refer to "handbells."

See also
List of pasta
Campanella (disambiguation)
Italian cuisine
La campanella, one of Franz Liszt's Grandes études de Paganini

References

External links

Types of pasta

it:Tipi di pasta#Paste corte